The 1185 papal election (held November 25) was a convoked after the death of Pope Lucius III. It resulted in the election of Cardinal Uberto Crivelli of Milan, who took the name of Urban III.

Besieged in Verona

Pope Lucius III was elected on 1 September 1181, but had to be consecrated and enthroned at Velletri, due to the hostility of the Romans. But, having refused to grant the consuetudines to the Romans which had been conceded by earlier popes, he was forced to retreat to Velletri. In the meantime, refugees from Tusculum, which had been destroyed earlier in the century by the Roman commune, began to rebuild their fortifications. Annoyed by the challenge, the Roman commune reopened the war, devastated the territory of Tusculum in April 1184, and then turned their wrath against Latium. The pope then fled to the Emperor Frederick Barbarossa, who was at Verona, by way of Ancona, Rimini, Faenza, and Modena. Some of the cardinals followed Pope Lucius to Verona; others, however, whose followers had perpetrated the outrages at Tusculum and in the Roman campagna, remained in the city.

Ten cardinals who were with the refugee pope participated in the consecration of the cathedral of Modena on 14 July 1184. They were: Theodinus of Porto, Tebaldus of Ostia; Joannes of S. Marco, Laborans of S. Maria Transtiberim, Pandulfus of Ss. Apostolorum, Ubertus of S. Lorenzo in Damaso; Ardicio of S. Teodoro, Graziano of Ss. Cosma e Damiano, Goffredfus of S. Maria in Via Lata, and Albinus of S. Maria Nuova.

Discussions between the pope and the emperor quickly turned sour. There was the matter of lay appointment to bishops, and the issue of the inheritance of Mathilda of Tuscany, which had been willed to S. Peter, but which was in imperial hands and of which the emperor insisted he was the feudal overlord. Frustrated and angry, the emperor withdrew to the palace in Pavia. He placed a military cordon around Verona, permitting no one to go to the papal court and allowing no one to leave Verona. Anyone caught was subject to imprisonment and torture.

List of participants
There were probably 26 cardinals in the Sacred College at the death of Lucius III on 25 November 1185. On 11 November 1185, two weeks before the pope's death, eighteen cardinals subscribed a bull in favor of the monastery of S. Peter Lobiensis. This was the last day on which bulls were signed before the pope's death.

Ten electors were created by Pope Lucius III, five by Pope Alexander III, and three by Pope Adrian IV.

Absentee cardinals

Four absentees were appointed by Alexander III, three by Lucius III, one by Adrian IV, and one by Pope Lucius II.

Death of Lucius III and the election of Pope Urban III
Pope Lucius III died at Verona on 25 November 1185, at very advanced age. On that same day, eighteen cardinals started proceedings to elect his successor. Majority of them came from Northern Italy and formed a radically anti-imperial faction, while more moderate cardinals (mostly Romans) were absent. In such circumstances, Northern Italian cardinals quickly secured the election of their candidate Uberto Crivelli of Milan. Crivelli was widely known to have a long-standing rancor against Barbarossa, who had singled out his family and followers when he had conquered Milan, some of whom he ordered to be executed, others to be mutilated. In the words of Ferdinand Gregorovius, he was "... a violent and unyielding spirit, and a strong opponent of Frederick." He was unanimously elected within a few hours after the death of Lucius III, and took the name Urban III. He was crowned at Verona in S. Pietro in monte, on 1 December 1185.

After his election to the papacy, he retained the administration of the metropolitan see of Milan.

Notes

Sources
 Gregorovius, Ferdinand (1896). The History of Rome in the Middle Ages Vol. IV, part 2. London: George Bell 1896.

1185
1185 in Europe
12th-century elections
1185
12th-century Catholicism